Valley of the Head Hunters (reissued as Valley of Head Hunters) is a 1953 adventure film directed by William Berke and starring Johnny Weissmuller in his eleventh appearance as Jungle Jim.

Plot
The District Commissioner sends out his representatives to have the native chiefs sign their lands over to the Crown for mineral exploration and mining. A small criminal syndicate seek the land themselves to gain the oil concessions. To obtain the land for themselves and eliminate the unwilling native chiefs they create a sham headhunter tribe.

Cast
Johnny Weissmuller  as Jungle Jim
 Christine Larson  as Ellen Shaw
Robert Foulk  as  Arco 
Steven Ritch  as Lt. Barry
Nelson Leigh  as 	Mr. Bradley
 Joseph Allen  as  Pico 
George Eldredge  as District Commissioner Kingston

References

External links

Review of film at Variety

1953 films
Jungle Jim films
Columbia Pictures films
Films set in Kenya
Films directed by William A. Berke
American adventure films
1953 adventure films
American black-and-white films
1950s English-language films
1950s American films